The Yatabe blenny (Parablennius yatabei) is a species of combtooth blenny found in the northwest Pacific Ocean along the coasts of southern Japan and Korea.  This species reaches a length of  TL. The specific name was coined in memory of Jordan and Snyder's friend and fellow alumnus at Cornell University the botanist Riokichi Yatabe [1851-1899] who drowned in an accident while on holiday in Japan.

References

Yatabe blenny
Fish of Japan
Fish of East Asia
Yatabe blenny
Taxa named by David Starr Jordan